Rhododendron fictolacteum is a species of plant in the family Ericaceae. It is endemic to China.

References

Flora of China
fictolacteum
Conservation dependent plants
Taxonomy articles created by Polbot
Taxa named by Isaac Bayley Balfour